Joseph Ehrismann (1880–1937) was a painter and master stained glass maker from Alsace. He was born as a German citizen in Alsace-Lorraine, and died as a French citizen in Bas-Rhin, without having substantially left his home region.

Having obtained the title of Meisterschüler, Ehrismann then established his own workshop, providing stained-glass windows for a number of churches and public institutions across Alsace, but also some murals.

Many of Ehrismann's creations have been destroyed during World War II, or due to fires having gutted the churches, but a number of them can still be seen in situ in Strasbourg, Mulhouse, Colmar, Schiltigheim, Bischheim, Molsheim, Meistratzheim, Lampertsloch, Betschdorf, and Weitbruch.

Gallery

References

External links 

Joseph Ehrismann on the database of the French Ministry of Culture

Chevaliers of the Ordre des Palmes Académiques
1880 births
1937 deaths
Painters from Alsace
People from Bas-Rhin
German stained glass artists and manufacturers
French stained glass artists and manufacturers
20th-century German male artists
20th-century French male artists
Academy of Fine Arts, Munich alumni